This is the discography for American jazz musician Chico Freeman.

As leader 

Morning Prayer (India Navigation/Whynot, 1976)
Chico (India Navigation, 1977)
Beyond the Rain (Contemporary, 1978)
Kings of Mali (India Navigation, 1978)
The Outside Within (India Navigation, 1978)
Spirit Sensitive (India Navigation, 1979)
No Time Left (Black Saint,  1979)
Peaceful Heart, Gentle Spirit (Contemporary, 1980)
Destiny's Dance (Contemporary, 1981)
Tradition in Transition (Elektra/Musician, 1982)
The Search (India Navigation, 1982)
Tangents featuring Bobby McFerrin (Elektra/Musician, 1984)
Live at Ronnie Scott’s (Hendring, 1988; recorded 1986)
The Pied Piper (Black-Hawk, 1987)
Tales of Ellington (Black-Hawk, 1987)
Lord Riff and Me (Whynot/Candid, 2010; recorded 1987)
Mystical Dreamer with Brainstorm (In & Out, 1989)
You’ll Know When You Get There (Black Saint, 1990)
Sweet Explosion with Brainstorm (In & Out, 1990)
Threshold with Brainstorm (In & Out, 1993)
The Unspoken Word with Arthur Blythe live at Ronnie Scott’s (Jazz House, 1994)
Focus (Contemporary, 1995)
Still Sensitive (India Navigation, 1995)
The Emissary (Clarity, 1996)
Oh, by the Way with Guataca (Double Moon, 2002)
Out of Many Comes the One (Arabesque, 2004)
The Essence of Silence with the Fritz Pauer Trio (CD Baby/Jive Music, 2010)
Elvin: Tribute to Elvin Jones with Joe Lovano (CD Baby/Jive Music/Edel, 2012)
The Arrival with Heiri Känzig (Intakt, 2015)
Spoken Into Existence (Jive Music, 2015)

As co-leader 
With Arthur Blythe
Luminous (Jazz House, 1989)
Night Song (Clarity, 1997)
With Von Freeman
Freeman & Freeman (India Navigation, 1981)
Fathers & Sons (Columbia, 1982), only B-side (A-side provided by Marsalis family) 
Live at the Blue Note with Special Guest Dianne Reeves (Half Note, 1999)
With The Leaders
Mudfoot (Black-Hawk, 1986)
Out Here Like This (Black-Hawk, 1987)
Unforeseen Blessings (Black Saint, 1988)
Slipping and Sliding (Sound Hills, 1994)
Spirits Alike (Double Moon, 2007)
With David Murray
David Murray, Chico Freeman with Özay (ITM, 2011)
With Roots (Arthur Blythe, Nathan Davis, Sam Rivers, a.o.)
Salutes the Saxophone - Tributes to John Coltrane, Dexter Gordon, Sonny Rollins and Lester Young (In & Out, 1992)
Stablemates (In & Out, 1993)
Say Something (In & Out, 1995)
For Diz & Bird (In & Out, 2000)
With Mal Waldron
Up and Down (Black Saint, 1989)
With The Young Lions (a.k.a. Lincoln Center Stars), feat. Wynton Marsalis, Paquito D’Rivera, Kevin Eubanks, Anthony Davis, a.o.
The Young Lions (Elektra/Musician, 1982)

As sideman 
With Ahmed Abdullah
Live at Ali's Alley (Cadence Jazz, 1980)
With Jack DeJohnette
Tin Can Alley (ECM, 1981)
Inflation Blues (ECM, 1983)
With Kip Hanrahan
Coup de tête (American Clavé, 1981)
Tenderness (American Clavé, 1990)
All Roads Are Made of the Flesh (American Clavé, 1995)
With Jay Hoggard
Rain Forrest (Contemporary, 1981)
With La Mont Zeno Theatre
Black Fairy (Taifa, 1975)
With Carmen Lundy
Moment to Moment (Arabesque, 1992)
With Cecil McBee
Music from the Source (Enja, 1978)
Compassion (Enja, 1979)
Alternate Spaces (India Navigation, 1979)
With Don Pullen, Fred Hopkins and Bobby Battle
Warriors (Black Saint, 1978)
With The Pyramids
Music of Idris Ackamoor (Compilation on EM (Japan), 2006)
With Sam Rivers' Rivbea All-Star Orchestra
Inspiration (BMG France, 1999)
Culmination (BMG France, 1999)
With Dom Um Romão
Saudades (Water Lily Acoustics, 1993)
With McCoy Tyner
La Leyenda de La Hora (Columbia, 1981)
With Edward Vesala
Heavy Life (Leo, 1980)
With the Reto Weber Percussion Orchestra and Franco Ambrosetti
Face to Face (Live at the Jazzfest Berlin '99) (Double Moon, 1999)
With Mari Wilson
The Rhythm Romance (Dino, 1991)

References

Jazz discographies
Discographies of American artists